Guingamp station (French: Gare de Guingamp) is a railway station serving the town of Guingamp, Côtes-d'Armor department, western France. It is on the Paris–Brest railway, and is also an important station for the local railway network TER Bretagne.

Services

The station is served by high speed trains to Brest, Rennes and Paris, and regional trains to Brest, Lannion, Carhaix, Paimpol and Rennes.

References

Railway stations in Côtes-d'Armor
TER Bretagne
Railway stations in France opened in 1863